The 22nd South American Youth Championships in Athletics were held in Cali, Colombia from November 28–30, 2014.  The event was held jointly with the I Central American Youth Grand Prix (I Grand Prix Centroamericano Youth).  The majority of events took place at Estadio Pascual Guerrero, whereas throwing events were held at Estadio Pedro Grajales.

A detailed report and an appraisal of the results was given.

Medal summary
Complete results were published.

Boys

1: In the 1500m event, Carlos Santiago Hernández from  tied for the 3rd place in 4:00.62 competing as guest.

Girls

4: In 2000m steeplechase, María Paula Guerrero from Colombia was 2nd in 7:13.38 competing as guest.

Mixed

Medal table
The unofficial medal count is in agreement with an official publication.

Participation
According to an unofficial count, 337 athletes from 12 countries participated. 

 (17)
 (14)
 (69)
 (39)
 (66)
 (37)
 (3)
 (9)
 (15)
 (33)
 (15)
 (20)

In addition, 77 athletes participated in the Central American Youth Grand Prix, 35 athletes in 12 international teams:

/ (2)
 (1)
 (1)
 (18)
 (1)
 (5)
 (1)
 (2)
 (1)
 (1)
 (1)
 (1)

and 42 athletes in 9 local teams from Colombian departments:

 Bogotá (3)
 Boyacá (3)
 Cauca (2)
 Cundinamarca (3)
 Quindío (2)
 Risaralda (9)
 San Andrés y Providencia (4)
 Santander (1)
 Valle del Cauca (15)

Team trophies
Brazil won the team trophies in two categories, overall and boys, while Colombia won the girls category.

Total

Boys

Girls

References

South American U18 Championships in Athletics
South American Youth Championships in Athletics
South American Youth Championships in Athletics
South American Youth Championships in Athletics
International athletics competitions hosted by Colombia
South American Youth Championships in Athletics